Cultural property protection in Poland

Cultural property im Poland
According to Polish law, a cultural property item (its plural form, means cultural property) is defined as an "immovable or a movable item, their parts or complexes, which are human creations or their byproducts, serving as a testimony of a past epoch or event, and whose preservation is in the societal interest due to their historical, artistic or scientific value." 

The designation has sometimes also colloquially been used by humanities and arts scholars in a meaning incompatible with the legal definition, extended to cover also selected intangible cultural heritage item types, in particular language, works of literature and music compositions (other than historical manuscripts, pieces of rare or historical editions, or historical documents, considered cultural property items), but its usage in such meaning has mainly been confined to professional jargon in humanities and the arts, while not being prevalent in everyday language.

The increase in public awareness in Poland of cultural heritage after the damage done during World War II, was largely the work of Jan Zachwatowicz, the Polish signatory of the Venice Charter.

Classification by type
The cultural property is officially classified into three categories: movable cultural property, immovable cultural property, archaeological cultural property.

Immovable cultural property
Immovable cultural property are categorized as type A items and include the following:
 buildings or other individual constructions such as public art or memorials that have significant cultural value.
 Group of buildings that constitutes a coherent unit, regardless of individual value, such as a cultural landscape or cityscape.
 Park of cultural importance, including natural monuments such as valuable trees, group of trees (park, forest, lane, etc.) or a boulder.

Movable cultural property
Movable cultural property, such as works of art or technology, as well as library or archival items, are catalogued as type B items; however, the Registry does not include movable items included in a museum inventory, in the national library collections or the national archival fonds.

Archaeological cultural property
Archaeological sites and artifacts are catalogued as type C items; however, the Registry does not include artifacts included in a museum inventory,.

Classification by form of recognition
Objects are recognized as cultural heritage protected by law in four ways:
 if an object is added to the Registry of Cultural Property (Rejestr zabytków)
  if the heritage assigned a special status of Historic Monument (Pomnik historii); see List of Historic Monuments (Poland) for a complete list
 if the object is classified as a cultural park (Park kulturowy)
 if a local government declares the object in need of protection

Cultural property protection organs
The cultural property protection organs of the national administration include the 16 voivodeship offices for cultural property protection  headed by a voivodeship cultural property conservator acting on behalf of the voivode. In addition, selected units of territorial self-government: gminas, cities with county rights and counties have used an option to appoint a communal, municipal, city or county cultural property conservator , with some tasks of the voivodeship conservator usually delegated to such an official under an agreement with the respective voivode, while the heads of the maritime offices are the first-tier organs in matters concerning maritime cultural property. Other state bodies may also be designated a first-tier organ in specific, justified cases on an ad hoc basis. The cultural property data is processed at the national level by the National Institute of Cultural Heritage, the latter also operating the National List of Intangible Cultural Heritage on behalf of the minister responsible for national cultural heritage, while all the abovementioned institutions are overseen by the General Cultural Property Conservator, an office fulfilling the tasks of the second-tier organ, held by a secretary or an undersecretary of state at the ministry responsible for national cultural heritage and acting on behalf of the minister.

See also
 Culture of Poland
 National Heritage Site
 World Heritage Sites of Poland
 List of Historic Monuments (Poland)

Notes

References

Further reading

 
Law of Poland